The Morozovs is a famous Old Believers Russian family of merchants and entrepreneurs. The family name Morozov originates from a Russian word moroz (мороз) that means frost. The founder of the family was Savva Vasilyevich Morozov (1770–1862). He had five sons and a daughter, Varvara Savvichna Morozova.

The merchant family of Morozovs should not be confused with another famous Old Believer: boyarynya Feodosiya Morozova (and her family). The latter were boyars, whereas almost all the other famous Morozovs were merchants, and also descendants of peasants.

Five sons
Savva Vasilyevich's sons were all involved in his business:
 Elisei Savvich Morozov (1798-1868)
 Zhakar Savvich Morozov (1802–1857)
 Abram Savvich Morozov (1806–1856)
 Ivan Savvich Morozov (1810–1864)
 Timofei Savvich Morozov (1823–1889)

The four branches

The family business was divided into four in 1871.
 Zakharovichi: Ivan Zakharovich Morozov, (Bogorodsk-Glukhovo factory)
 Abramovichi: Abram Abramovich Morozov, (Tver Manufactory)
 Vikulovichi: Vikul Eliseevich Morozov, (Nikolskoye Manufactory)
 Timofeevichi: Timofei Savvich Morozo,  (Nikolskaya Manufactory)

Zakharovichi
Ivan Zakharovich Morozov (1823-1888)
 Arseny Ivanovich Morozov - creator of the choir of znamennoe singing.

Abramovichi
 Abram Abramovich Morozov (1839—1882)
 Varvara Alekseevna Morozova  (1848-1917)  wife of Abram Abramovich Morozov
 Mikhail Abramovich Morozov (1870-1903), eldest son
 Ivan Morozov (1871–1921), second son was a Russian businessman and from 1907 to 1914 a major collector of avant-garde French art.
 Arseny Abramovich Morozov (1874-1908), youngest son

Vikulovichi
Vikul Eliseevich Morozov (1829-1894)
Alexei Vikulovich Morozov (1857-1934), son
Vera Vikulovna Morozova (1858-1916), daughter and mother of Nikolai Pavlovich Schmidt, Bolshevik supporter
Ivan Vikulovich Morozov (1865-1933), son
Varvara Alexandrona Morozova, wife of Ivan
Olgaa Ivanovna Morozova (1897-)
Vera Ivanovna Morozova (1900-)

Timofeevichi
Timofei Savvich Morozov (1823-1889)
Maria Feodorovna Morozova (1830–1911) wife of Timofei Savvich Morozov
Yulia Timofeevna Krestovnikova (1858–1905), daughter
Savva Timofeyevich Morozov (1862–1905), son, an entrepreneur, patron of art and of Russian revolutionary movement; sponsor of the Moscow Art Theatre,  Bolshevik supporter
Sergei Timofeevich Morozov (1863–1944), son, an entrepreneur,

See also
Morozov (surname)

References

Russian families
Old Believers